Stelios Serafidis (6 August 1935 – 4 January 2022) was a Greek professional footballer who played as a goalkeeper for AEK Athens. Serafidis was among the most reliable and consistent goalkeepers in the history of the club. Gifted with agility and excellent reflexes, he was famous for his high diving saves under tough conditions. Despite his small stature, he managed to become one of the top players in the 1950's and 1960's and he is considered as one of the top Greek goalkeepers of all time.

Early life
Born on 6 August 1935 in Gazi, Athens, to refugee parents from Pontus and raised in Aigaleo, Serafidis had a particularly difficult childhood like most children of that time before, during and after World War II. Before playing football he did various small jobs to make a living. He worked as a water carrier, baker, porter, shoe polisher and peddler. His older brother Lambis, who was an international striker at Apollon Athens, brought him at the age of 14 to his club. He stayed there for a very short period and then, at the age of 16, was transferred to the infrastructure departments of AEK Athens.

Club career
After two years with the reserve team, followed by a year in the second team of AEK and from 1954 onwards, Serafidis became the main goalkeeper of the team for almost 20 years, with 323 appearances in all competitions (of which 243 for the league, 37 for the Greek Cup, 40 for the Athens Championship and 3 for the UEFA competitions) winning 3 league titles and 3 Cups. He was the main goalkeeper of AEK in the final of the Balkans Cup of 1967 against Fenerbahçe, where AEK Athens won the silver medal. On 27 October 1968 in the derby at Karaiskakis Stadium against Olympiacos, at the 85th minute and while they were ahead by 3–2, Serafidis kicked the striker of the red and whites, Giorgos Sideris, after the latter had previously kicked him in the knee while he was catching the ball from a cross. This action resulted in his dismissal of and the coach of AEK at the time, Branko Stanković did not proceed in a substitution sending the forward and the club's star player, Mimis Papaioannou to replace Serafidis under the goalposts for the remaining 5 minutes. Papaioannou responded well in the position keeping the post in tact, even making two saves. He was part of the squad that reached the quarter-finals of the European Cup in 1969. He retired in the summer of 1972, at the age of 37.

International career
Serafidis was a permanent member of the Greece national team, even though he had only one appearance in an official match in the 4–0 away defeat against Poland on 20 May 1963. He did not manage to make more appearances, because he was the back up choice to Theodoridis and Ikonomopoulos.

After football
After he retired, Serafidis went on to offer his services to AEK for a number of consecutive years as coach. He returned in 1973 as a goalkeeping coach and remained in that position for over 2 decades. He worked for many years with the club's goalkeepers and later on he undertook similar duties for the AEK Athens Academy. Although he was in his eighties, Serafidis was always close to his beloved AEK in both home and away matches, whereas he was the president of the Veterans Association of AEK Athens. His name is honoured on one of the four pillars of AEK Athens' new stadium, Agia Sophia Stadium, alongside other important figures of the club's history such as Kostas Nestoridis, Mimis Papaioannou and Thomas Mavros. Furthermore, the name "Serafidion" was given to the training ground of AEK Athens in his honour. He died after a long battle with cancer on 4 January 2022, at the age of 86.

Honours

AEK Athens
Alpha Ethniki: 1962–63, 1967–68, 1970–71
Greek Cup: 1955–56, 1963–64, 1965–66

See also
List of one-club men in association football

References

External links

1935 births
2022 deaths 
Deaths from cancer in Greece
Footballers from Athens
Greek footballers
Greece international footballers
Association football goalkeepers
AEK Athens F.C. players
Super League Greece players
AEK Athens F.C. non-playing staff